Rudolph J. Daley (September 10, 1918 – September 26, 1990) was a Vermont attorney, politician, and judge.  He is most notable for serving as an associate justice of the Vermont Supreme Court from 1972 to 1980.

Early life
Daley was born John Rudolph Edward Daley in Newport, Vermont on September 10, 1918, the son of Patrick T. Daley and Fedora (Borque) Daley.  He attended Sacred Heart parochial school in Newport, and graduated from Newport High School.  Daley attended Saint Michael's College for a year, and then began the study of law in the office of attorney Raymond L. Miles of Newport.  Daley was admitted to the bar in 1946, and practiced in Newport.

Military service
Daley was a longtime member of the Vermont Army National Guard; he enlisted in 1935, and received his commission as a second lieutenant of infantry in 1941.  He served on active duty with the 43rd Infantry Division in the Pacific Theater from 1943 to 1945, and was serving at the Tulare, California prisoner of war camp at the time of his 1945 wedding.  He transferred to the judge advocate general corps after becoming an attorney, and he returned to active duty again when the division was called to federal service during the Korean War, serving this time in West Germany.  Daley was promoted to lieutenant colonel in 1960, attained the rank of colonel in the mid-1960s, and retired from the military in the late 1960s.

Early career
A Republican, Daley served as State's Attorney of Orleans County from 1947 to 1950, and 1953 to 1957.  He was Newport's City Attorney from 1949 to 1950, and again from 1957 to 1959.  In 1956, Daley was elected to represent Newport in the Vermont House of Representatives, and he was reelected in 1958.

Judicial career
In 1959, Daley was appointed a judge of the Vermont Superior Court.  By 1966, Daley had advanced by seniority to become chief judge of the superior court.  By tradition, the chief judge of the superior court was next in line for appointment to the Vermont Supreme Court.

In 1972, Daley was appointed as an associate justice of the Vermont Supreme Court, filling the vacancy created when Associate Percival L. Shangraw was promoted to chief justice.

Daley remained on the court until retiring in 1980, and was succeeded by Wynn Underwood.

Retirement and death
In retirement, Daley was a resident of Newport, and he died in Newport on September 26, 1990.  Daley was buried at St. Mary's Cemetery in Newport.

Family
In 1945, Daley married Blanche Daigle (1918-1986).  They were the parents of Daniel, Rosemary, Anne Marie, and Timothy.

References

Sources

Newspapers

Books

Internet

External links

1918 births
1990 deaths
People from Newport (city), Vermont
National Guard (United States) colonels
United States Army personnel of World War II
U.S. state supreme court judges admitted to the practice of law by reading law
Vermont lawyers
State's attorneys in Vermont
Republican Party members of the Vermont House of Representatives
Justices of the Vermont Supreme Court
Burials in Vermont
Vermont National Guard personnel
20th-century American politicians
20th-century American judges
20th-century American lawyers